Nathan Collett is a filmmaker based in Nairobi, Kenya.

Film career

Overview
Collett's work focuses on those on the margins of society as well as on environmental issues. He has filmed across the world, including location footage in Somalia and South America. He works both in fictional films and on documentaries, with a specific focus on Kibera in Kenya, Africa's largest shantytown. He is a co-owner of Hot Sun Films, a film/video production and training company. One of Hot Sun Films' projects is the Hot Sun Foundation, a non-profit organization. The organization gives training to the youth of Kibera in film and video, and also started the first film school for local youngsters.

Films

The Oath
The Oath is a 2005 short drama film written by Collett and Njuguna Wakanyote. Set in 1950s Kenya during the Mau Mau uprising under British colonialism, the film portrays the struggle between two brothers on opposite sides of the conflict.

Kibera Kid
Kibera Kid is a short film set in the Kibera slums in Nairobi, Kenya. It was written, directed and co-produced by Collett in collaboration with local people in Kibera.

Charcoal Traffic
In 2008, Collett directed the short film Charcoal Traffic, which was written by and co-produced with the Somali environmentalist Fatima Jibrell. The film was shot on location in Somalia, and employs a fictional storyline to educate the public about the ecological damage that charcoal production can create.

Togetherness Supreme
In April 2009, Collett shot his first feature film Togetherness Supreme, in collaboration with the local community in front and behind the camera. It is the follow-up to Kibera Kid and was shot on the Red One camera, the first time the camera was used in Kibera to shoot a feature film. The film is set in Kibera, and focusing on tribal tensions and the possibilities of reconciliation in Africa's largest shantytown. Togetherness Supreme was first shown to the community in Kibera where over 3,000 people turned up for one screening, and over 26,000 people watched it in the community. The film has been dubbed "Slumdog without the Millionaires" by the Vancouver International Film Festival, in reference to the 2008 movie Slumdog Millionaire. Togetherness Supreme tells a community-based authentic story of love, conflict and reconciliation in the midst of ethnic and political violence.

Awards
Collett won multiple awards for the short film Kibera Kid. Togetherness Supreme also won 'Best International Film' at the Santa Barbara International Film Festival 2011, which was the US premiere of the film. Togetherness Supreme also won the Global Landscapes Award at Cinequest film festival 2011

Filmography
Collett's films as a director include:

 Togetherness Supreme (2010)
 Charcoal Traffic (2008)
 Chronic in Kenya (2007)
 Sex to Survive (2007)
 Kibera Kid (2006)
 The Oath (2005)

References

External links
 
 Article on community based approach / Togetherness Supreme
 News article on Togetherness Supreme 
 Kibera Kid
Video sites
 Chronic in Kenya Short Documentary
 Sex To Survive Short Documentary
 link to Togetherness Supreme Trailer Vimeo
 The Oath Trailer on YouTube
 TV News Report on Kibera Kid, Nathan Collett 
 Kibera  Kid Trailer
 Charcoal Traffic Trailer

Kenyan film directors
Living people
Year of birth missing (living people)
Fulbright alumni